First National Bank Tanzania (FNBT), is a commercial bank in Tanzania. It is one of the commercial banks licensed by the Bank of Tanzania, the national banking regulator.  It is a subsidiary of South Africa-based FirstRand Group.

FNBT is a small commercial bank in Tanzania.

History
The bank commenced operations in Tanzania, in July 2011, following the issuance of a commercial banking licence by the Bank of Tanzania, the country's central bank and national banking regulator. Its headquarters and main branch are located in Dar es Salaam, the national capital and largest city in the country.

Ownership
, FNBT stock is 100% owned by the FirstRand Group, a large financial services provider, based in South Africa, with subsidiaries in about 10 sub-Saharan countries, as well as in Australia and India. The stock of the group is listed on the Johannesburg Securities Exchange (JSE), where it trades under the symbol: FSR.

In July 2022, First National Bank of Tanzania was acquired by Exim Bank (Tanzania), for an undisclosed financial consideration. According to media reports, FNBT then ceased 
operations.

Branch network
, First National Bank of Tanzania maintains branches at the following locations:

 Main Branch – Dar es Salaam (Operational)
 Peninsula Branch – Dar es Salaam (Operational)
 Industrial Branch – Dar es Salaam (Operational)
 Kariakoo Branch – Dar es Salaam (Operational)
 Sinza Branch – Dar es Salaam (Operational)
 Mbezi Beach Branch – Dar es Salaam (Operational)
 Kimweri Branch – Dar es Salaam (Operational)
 Arusha Branch – Arusha (Operational)
 Mwanza Banch – Mwanza (Operational)
 Mbeya Branch – Mbeya (Coming soon)
 Dodoma Branch – Dodoma (Coming soon)

See also
 List of banks in Tanzania
 FirstRand
 First National Bank (South Africa)
 Economy of Tanzania

References

External links 
 Website of Bank of Tanzania 

Banks of Tanzania
Companies of Tanzania
Banks established in 2011
Economy of Tanzania
2011 establishments in Tanzania
FirstRand